The 1913–14 season was the 22nd in the history of the Western Football League.

The league champions this season were Cardiff City Reserves, the first time they had won the league. This was the last season before the outbreak of World War I, which halted all organised football in the United Kingdom for several years. The Western League did not recommence until the 1919–20 season, when a number of new clubs joined the league and a second division was formed. Several clubs did not rejoin the league after the war.

Final table
One new club joined the league, although the number of clubs remained at 12 after Barry District left to join the Southern League.
Trowbridge Town, rejoining the league after leaving in 1907.

References

1913-14
1913–14 in English association football leagues
1913–14 in Welsh football